The Belgian Bowl XIII was played in 2000 and was won by the Izeghem Redskins.

Playoffs

References

External links
Official Belgian Bowl website

American football in Belgium
Belgian Bowl
Belgian Bowl